Mridula Jaiswal is an Indian politician belonging to the Bhartiya Janata Party and the current mayor of Varanasi, Uttar Pradesh since 2017.

Political life 
Jaiswal is a Bharatiya Janata Party politician. In 2017, she became the mayor of Varanasi, Uttar Pradesh. In the corporation election, she defeated Indian National Congress candidate Shalini Yadav by a margin of 78,843 votes.

Residence
She lives Near "Ghanti Mill Road", Sigra in Varanasi.

References 

Living people
Bharatiya Janata Party politicians from Uttar Pradesh
Mayors of Varanasi
Year of birth missing (living people)
Women mayors of places in Uttar Pradesh